Boisseaux is a railway station in Boisseaux, Centre-Val de Loire, France. The station was opened on 5 May 1843, and is located on the Paris–Bordeaux railway line, about 80 km outside Paris.

The station is served by regional trains (TER Centre-Val de Loire) to Orléans, Étampes and Paris. The station is served by about 3 trains per day in each direction.

References

TER Centre-Val de Loire
Railway stations in France opened in 1843
Railway stations in Loiret